James Edward Goodson (born January 25, 1948) is a former first baseman and third baseman in Major League Baseball. He played from 1970 to 1977 for the San Francisco Giants, Atlanta Braves and Los Angeles Dodgers. In his one World Series plate appearance, in the sixth game of the 1977 fall classic, he was struck out by the Yankees’ Mike Torrez.

In 515 games over eight seasons, Goodson posted a .260 batting average (329-for-1266) with 108 runs, 51 doubles, 30 home runs and 170 RBIs. Defensively, he recorded a .994 fielding percentage at first base, his primary position, and a .911 fielding percentage at third base for an overall .976 fielding percentage.

External links

1948 births
Living people
Major League Baseball first basemen
Major League Baseball third basemen
East Tennessee State Buccaneers baseball players
Los Angeles Dodgers players
San Francisco Giants players
Atlanta Braves players
Baseball players from Virginia
People from Pulaski, Virginia
Salt Lake City Giants players
Great Falls Giants players
Decatur Commodores players
Fresno Giants players
Phoenix Giants players
Portland Beavers players